Arguedas may refer to:

People with the surname 
 José María Arguedas (1911–1969), Peruvian novelist
 Alcides Arguedas (1879–1946), Bolivian writer and historian
 Juan Carlos Arguedas (born 1970), Costa Rican soccer player

Places
Arguedas, Navarre, a municipality located in the province and autonomous community of Navarre, northern Spain.